Erik Morán Arribas (born 25 May 1991) is a Spanish professional footballer who plays for SD Ponferradina as a defensive midfielder.

Club career
Born in Portugalete, Biscay, Morán joined Athletic Bilbao's youth setup in 2004, aged 13. On 28 November 2012 he made his debut with the first team, starting in a 2–0 away win against Hapoel Ironi Kiryat Shmona F.C. in that  season's UEFA Europa League. On 14 April of the following year he played his first game in La Liga, coming on as an 80th-minute substitute for Iker Muniain in a 0–3 home loss to Real Madrid.

Morán was promoted to Athletic's first team in August 2013, signing a contract extension until 2016 and being handed the number 5 shirt. On 29 January 2015, after appearing rarely during the campaign, he was loaned to Segunda División's CD Leganés until June.

On 23 July 2015, Morán moved to Real Zaragoza in a one-year loan deal. On 1 July of the following year, he agreed to a permanent two-year contract with the club as Athletic opted to not recall him after the loan expired.

On 31 January 2017, Morán returned to Leganés, who now competed in the top flight, after an agreement with Zaragoza was reached. Roughly one year later, in another winter transfer market move, he signed a three-and-a-half-year contract at Super League Greece club AEK Athens F.C. for €130,000 and a resale rate of 10%, being brought in as a replacement for seriously injured Jakob Johansson. He left in December 2019.

Morán returned to Spain in January 2020, signing a short-term deal with CD Numancia in the second division. On 28 August, after being relegated, he joined SD Ponferradina of the same league.

Honours
AEK Athens
Super League Greece: 2017–18

References

External links

1991 births
Living people
People from Portugalete
Sportspeople from Biscay
Spanish footballers
Footballers from the Basque Country (autonomous community)
Association football midfielders
La Liga players
Segunda División players
Segunda División B players
Tercera División players
CD Basconia footballers
Bilbao Athletic footballers
Athletic Bilbao footballers
CD Leganés players
Real Zaragoza players
Málaga CF players
CD Numancia players
SD Ponferradina players
Super League Greece players
AEK Athens F.C. players
Spain youth international footballers
Spanish expatriate footballers
Expatriate footballers in Greece
Spanish expatriate sportspeople in Greece